Pirata F.C. is a Peruvian professional soccer club based in José Leonardo Ortiz District in the city of Chiclayo, Lambayeque Region. The team currently competes in the Liga 2.

History
The club was founded on November 15, 2015 in the José Leonardo Ortiz District. It is named after the brother of honorary president Luis Alberto Guevara. Molinos El Pirata is owned by G&B Molinos, a rice processing plant.

El Pirata had a very successful maiden campaign which it started from the José Leonardo Ortiz District League in the Copa Perú. That year it finished the district league as runner-up and won the Chiclayo provincial league. It would then go on to become the Lambayeque departmental champion and qualify for the National Stage for the first time.

In the national stage it finished 14th out of 50 with three games won, two draws, and only one defeat against Comercial Aguas Verdes. This was enough for El Pirata to qualify for the play-offs which it played against Racing de Huamachuco. It lost the first leg 4–0 in Huamachuco and was close to overturning the result by winning 0–3.

The team had a short campaign in 2017 where it failed to overcome the Provincial Stage of the Copa Perú tournament.

In 2018, Molinos El Pirata won the José Leonardo Ortiz district league, and was runner-up in the Chiclayo provincial league to qualify for the Lambayeque Departamental Stage. In that stage it was drawn into Group A where it faced local rivals Carlos Stein as well as JJ Arquitectura, AJEC, and Porvernir Miraflores. It qualified to the semifinals as second in its group to play Estudiantes Boca. In the finals it defeated Carlos Stein by 3–1 on a single leg match.

In the National Stage, the team finished 3rd with of 50 with four games won and two drawn. A match between it and Carlos Stein was awarded to the latter. The last match of the group against UD Parachique, which ended in a draw, was awarded to Molinos El Pirata. The club then defeated Defensor Laure Sur by a global score of 4–4 and advance because of a better seed to the next stage. There it defeated Credicoop San Cristóbal by a global score of 5–4 to qualify for the final group stage or La Finalísima for the first time in its history.

In the final group stage it defeated Santos by 4–0 on November 24. It was then defeated by Alianza Universidad on November 28 leaving all four final group teams with 3 points each. In the final matchday, December 2, Alianza Universidad defeated Santos by 5–2 on the first match which meant Molinos El Pirata needed only to defeat its last rival, Unión Deportivo Ascensión, by more than two goals to win the tournament. The final score was 6–0.

Badge and colors
The team uses a green as its primary color. Its first badge consisted of a generic image of a pirate which was quickly changed to an image of Disney's fictional character Jack Sparrow from the Pirates of the Caribbean film series. The image of the character was placed inside a white circle which reads "MOLINOS EL PIRATA" on the upper half and "JOSÉ LEONARDO ORTIZ" at the bottom. After reaching the 2018 Copa Perú final group stage, the club changed its badge to that of a generic pirate drawing because of copyright infringement. Within days the generic pirate image was also taken down from the club's social media page as it too was used without permission. Before the first match of the final group stage, an image of a Jack Sparrow look-alike was unveiled by the team for use in their badge.

Rivalries
Pirata has had a long-standing rivalry with Carlos Stein.

Honours

National
Copa Perú:
Winners (1): 2018

Regional
Liga Departamental de Lambayeque:
Winners (2): 2016, 2018
Liga Provincial de Chiclayo:
Winners (1): 2016
Runner-up (1): 2018
Liga Distrital de José Leonardo Ortiz:
Winners (1): 2018
Runner-up (1): 2016

Current squad

Source:

 Note: The limit of foreign players in the Peruvian club templates is five. Furthermore, it should include Peruvian footballers born after 1996, forcing the accumulation of a minimum of 3,000 minutes of play throughout the 2018 Torneo Descentralizado.

References

Football clubs in Peru
Association football clubs established in 2015